Alex David Dieringer (born June 6, 1993) is an American freestyle wrestler and graduated folkstyle wrestler. In freestyle, he has had success in both the international and national circuit, claiming medals from tournaments such as the Bill Farrell Memorial, the  Ivan Yarygin Grand Prix, the US Open, among others. As a folkstyle wrestler, Dieringer was a three-time NCAA Division I National Champion, 2016 Dan Hodge Trophy winner, four-time All-American and four-time Big 12 Conference champion out of the Oklahoma State University.

Freestyle record

! colspan="7"| Senior Freestyle Matches
|-
!  Res.
!  Record
!  Opponent
!  Score
!  Date
!  Event
!  Location
|-
|Win
|81–20
|align=left| Isaiah Martinez
|style="font-size:88%"|4–1
|style="font-size:88%"|March 16, 2022
|style="font-size:88%"|Rudis+: Snyder vs. Cox
|style="text-align:left;font-size:88%;"|
 Detroit, Michigan
|-
! style=background:white colspan=7 | 
|-
|Loss
|80–20
|align=left| Gadzhi Nabiev
|style="font-size:88%"|2–5
|style="font-size:88%" rowspan=5|January 27–30, 2022
|style="font-size:88%" rowspan=5|Golden Grand Prix Ivan Yarygin 2022
|style="text-align:left;font-size:88%;" rowspan=5|
 Krasnoyarsk, Russia
|-
|Loss
|80–19
|align=left| Radik Valiev
|style="font-size:88%"|2–5
|-
|Win
|80–18
|align=left| Dmitrii Kuprin
|style="font-size:88%"|9–5
|-
|Win
|79–18
|align=left| Magomed Magomaev
|style="font-size:88%"|Fall
|-
|Win
|78–18
|align=left| Alik Badtiev
|style="font-size:88%"|Fall
|-
! style=background:white colspan=7 |
|-
|Loss
|77–18
|align=left| Jordan Burroughs
|style="font-size:88%"|3–4
|style="font-size:88%" rowspan=2|September 12, 2021
|style="font-size:88%" rowspan=5|2021 US World Team Trials
|style="text-align:left;font-size:88%;" rowspan=5| Lincoln, Nebraska
|-
|Loss
|77–17
|align=left| Jordan Burroughs
|style="font-size:88%"|5–10
|-
|Win
|77–16
|align=left| Isaiah Martinez
|style="font-size:88%"|6–1
|style="font-size:88%" rowspan=3|September 11, 2021
|-
|Win
|76–16
|align=left| David McFadden
|style="font-size:88%"|3–1
|-
|Win
|75–16
|align=left| Josh Shields
|style="font-size:88%"|9–1
|-
|Loss
|74-16
|align=left| Bo Nickal
|style="font-size:88%"|1-1
|style="font-size:88%"|September 19, 2020
|style="font-size:88%"|NLWC I
|style="text-align:left;font-size:88%;"|
 State College, Pennsylvania
|-
! style=background:white colspan=7 |
|-
|Win
|74-15
|align=left| Carlos Izquierdo
|style="font-size:88%"|TF 11-1
|style="font-size:88%" rowspan=4|March 6–9, 2020
|style="font-size:88%" rowspan=4|2020 Pan American Wrestling Championships
|style="text-align:left;font-size:88%;" rowspan=4| Ottawa, Canada
|-
|Loss
|73-15
|align=left| Yurieski Torreblanca
|style="font-size:88%"|1-2
|-
|Win
|73-14
|align=left| Ethan Ramos
|style="font-size:88%"|9-2
|-
|Win
|72-14
|align=left| Pedro Ceballos
|style="font-size:88%"|Fall
|-
! style=background:white colspan=7 |
|-
|NC
|71-14
|align=left| Zahid Valencia
|style="font-size:88%"|NC (overturned)
|style="font-size:88%" rowspan=4|January 15–18, 2020 
|style="font-size:88%" rowspan=4|2020 Matteo Pellicone Ranking Series
|style="text-align:left;font-size:88%;" rowspan=4|
 Rome, Italy
|-
|Win
|71-14
|align=left| Pat Downey
|style="font-size:88%"|3-2
|-
|Win
|70-14
|align=left| Rashid Kurbanov
|style="font-size:88%"|8-4
|-
|Win
|69-14
|align=left| Illia Archaia
|style="font-size:88%"|9-0
|-
! style=background:white colspan=7 |
|-
|Win
|68-14
|align=left| Brett Pfarr
|style="font-size:88%"|TF 10-0
|style="font-size:88%" rowspan=6|December 20–22, 2019
|style="font-size:88%" rowspan=6|2019 US Senior Nationals - US Olympic Trials Qualifier
|style="text-align:left;font-size:88%;" rowspan=6|
 Fort Worth, Texas
|-
|Win
|67-14
|align=left| Sammy Brooks
|style="font-size:88%"|TF 10-0
|-
|Loss
|66-14
|align=left| Myles Martin
|style="font-size:88%"|4-6
|-
|Win
|66-13
|align=left| Brett Pfarr
|style="font-size:88%"|2-1
|-
|Win
|65-13
|align=left| Ryan Loder
|style="font-size:88%"|TF 10-0
|-
|Win
|64-13
|align=left| Willie Miklus
|style="font-size:88%"|3-0
|-
! style=background:white colspan=7 | 
|-
|Win
|63-13
|align=left| Myles Martin
|style="font-size:88%"|7-2
|style="font-size:88%" rowspan=4|November 15–16, 2019
|style="font-size:88%" rowspan=4|2019 Bill Farrell Memorial International
|style="text-align:left;font-size:88%;" rowspan=4|
 New York
|-
|Win
|62-13
|align=left| Illia Archaia
|style="font-size:88%"|7-1
|-
|Win
|61-13
|align=left| Domenic Abounader
|style="font-size:88%"|6-2
|-
|Win
|60-13
|align=left| Ryan Loder
|style="font-size:88%"|TF 10-0
|-
! style=background:white colspan=7 |
|-
|Loss
|59-13
|align=left| Kyle Dake
|style="font-size:88%"|2-4
|style="font-size:88%" rowspan=2|August 17, 2019
|style="font-size:88%" rowspan=2|2019 Final X Special Wrestle-off: Dake vs. Dieringer
|style="text-align:left;font-size:88%;" rowspan=2|
 Austin, Texas
|-
|Loss
|59-12
|align=left| Kyle Dake
|style="font-size:88%"|2-3
|-
! style=background:white colspan=7 |
|-
|Win
|59-11
|align=left| Akhsarbek Gulaev
|style="font-size:88%"|4-1
|style="font-size:88%"rowspan=3|July 11–14, 2019
|style="font-size:88%"rowspan=3|2019 Grand Prix Yaşar Doğu
|style="text-align:left;font-size:88%;"rowspan=3|
 Istanbul, Turkey
|-
|Win
|58-11
|align=left| Bahman Teymouri
|style="font-size:88%"|5-0
|-
|Win
|57-11
|align=left| Abubakar Abakarov
|style="font-size:88%"|TF 10-0
|-
|Win
|56-11
|align=left| Zahid Valencia
|style="font-size:88%"|TF 12-2
|style="font-size:88%" rowspan=2|May 17–19, 2019
|style="font-size:88%" rowspan=2|2019 US World Team Trials Challenge
|style="text-align:left;font-size:88%;" rowspan=2| Raleigh, North Carolina
|-
|Win
|55-11
|align=left| Zahid Valencia
|style="font-size:88%"|TF 12-1
|-
! style=background:white colspan=7 | 
|-
|Win
|54-11
|align=left| Chance Marsteller
|style="font-size:88%"|TF 10-0
|style="font-size:88%" rowspan=5|April 24–27, 2019
|style="font-size:88%" rowspan=5|2019 US Open National Championships
|style="text-align:left;font-size:88%;" rowspan=5|
 Las Vegas, Nevada
|-
|Win
|53-11
|align=left| Geno Morelli
|style="font-size:88%"|TF 10-0
|-
|Win
|52-11
|align=left| Matt Finesilver
|style="font-size:88%"|TF 12-0
|-
|Win
|51-11
|align=left| Ryan Cone
|style="font-size:88%"|TF 10-0
|-
|Win
|50-11
|align=left| Joseph Castellino
|style="font-size:88%"|TF 10-0
|-
! style=background:white colspan=7 | 
|-
|Win
|49-11
|align=left| Omaraskhab Nazhmudinov
|style="font-size:88%"|TF 10-0
|style="font-size:88%" rowspan=4|February 28 - March 3, 2019
|style="font-size:88%" rowspan=4|2019 Alexander Medved Prizes
|style="text-align:left;font-size:88%;" rowspan=4|
 Ruse, Bulgaria
|-
|Win
|48-11
|align=left| Nika Kentchadze
|style="font-size:88%"|5-1
|-
|Win
|47-11
|align=left| Zaur Efendiev
|style="font-size:88%"|TF 10-0
|-
|Win
|46-11
|align=left| Muhammet Kotanoğlu
|style="font-size:88%"|TF 11-0
|-
! style=background:white colspan=7 |
|-
|Win
|45-11
|align=left| Alan Zaseev
|style="font-size:88%"|FF
|style="font-size:88%" rowspan=4|January 24–27, 2019
|style="font-size:88%" rowspan=4|Golden Grand Prix Ivan Yarygin 2019
|style="text-align:left;font-size:88%;" rowspan=4|
 Krasnoyarsk, Russia
|-
|Loss
|44-11
|align=left| Akhmed Gadzhimagomedov
|style="font-size:88%"|2-5
|-
|Win
|44-10
|align=left| Alan Zaseev
|style="font-size:88%"|7-3
|-
|Win
|43-10
|align=left| Zeping Lin
|style="font-size:88%"|TF 13-0
|-
! style=background:white colspan=7 | 
|-
|Win
|42-10
|align=left| Dovletmyrat Orazgylyjov
|style="font-size:88%"|TF 16-5
|style="font-size:88%" rowspan=4|September 14–16, 2018
|style="font-size:88%" rowspan=4|2018 Alexander Medved Prizes
|style="text-align:left;font-size:88%;" rowspan=4|
 Minsk, Belarus
|-
|Win
|41-10
|align=left| Oleksiy Sherbak
|style="font-size:88%"|10-1
|-
|Win
|40-10
|align=left| Santiago Martinez Restrepo
|style="font-size:88%"|TF 10-0
|-
|Win
|39-10
|align=left| Rustam Dudayev
|style="font-size:88%"|FF (9-2)
|-
! style=background:white colspan=7 |
|-
|Loss
|38-10
|align=left| Zahid Valencia
|style="font-size:88%"|1-5
|style="font-size:88%" rowspan=3|May 18–20, 2018
|style="font-size:88%" rowspan=3|2018 US World Team Trials Challenge
|style="text-align:left;font-size:88%;" rowspan=3| Rochester, Minnesota
|-
|Loss
|38-9
|align=left| Zahid Valencia
|style="font-size:88%"|0-7
|-
|Win
|38-8
|align=left| Nate Jackson
|style="font-size:88%"|TF 12-2
|-
! style=background:white colspan=7 | 
|-
|Loss
|37-8
|align=left| Kyle Dake
|style="font-size:88%"|5-5
|style="font-size:88%" rowspan=4|April 24–28, 2018
|style="font-size:88%" rowspan=4|2018 US Open National Championships
|style="text-align:left;font-size:88%;" rowspan=4|
 Las Vegas, Nevada
|-
|Win
|37-7
|align=left| Michael Evans
|style="font-size:88%"|TF 11-0
|-
|Win
|36-7
|align=left| Nate Jackson
|style="font-size:88%"|TF 10-0
|-
|Win
|35-7
|align=left| Hayden Harris
|style="font-size:88%"|TF 10-0
|-
! style=background:white colspan=7 | 
|-
|Win
|34-7
|align=left| Zelimkhan Khadjiev
|style="font-size:88%"|Fall
|style="font-size:88%" rowspan=3|March 30–31, 2018
|style="font-size:88%" rowspan=3|2018 Bill Farrell Memorial International
|style="text-align:left;font-size:88%;" rowspan=3|
 New York
|-
|Win
|33-7
|align=left| Daniyar Kaisanov
|style="font-size:88%"|TF 11-0
|-
|Win
|32-7
|align=left| Kevin Dufresne
|style="font-size:88%"|TF 12-1
|-
! style=background:white colspan=7 |
|-
|Win
|31-7
|align=left| Jabrayil Hasanov
|style="font-size:88%"|7-4
|style="font-size:88%" rowspan=5|February 23–25, 2018
|style="font-size:88%" rowspan=5|XXII Outstanding Ukrainian Wrestlers and Coaches Memorial
|style="text-align:left;font-size:88%;" rowspan=5| Kyiv, Ukraine
|-
|Win
|30-7
|align=left| Yajuro Yamasaki
|style="font-size:88%"|4-2
|-
|Win
|29-7
|align=left| Jumber Kvelashvili
|style="font-size:88%"|TF 11-0
|-
|Win
|28-7
|align=left| Omid Hassan Tabar Jelodar
|style="font-size:88%"|TF 10-0
|-
|Win
|27-7
|align=left| Jakov Makarashvili
|style="font-size:88%"|TF 10-0
|-
! style=background:white colspan=7 |
|-
|Win
|26-7
|align=left| Isaiah Martinez
|style="font-size:88%"|4-2
|style="font-size:88%" rowspan=3|June 9, 2017
|style="font-size:88%" rowspan=3|2017 US World Team Trials Challenge
|style="text-align:left;font-size:88%;" rowspan=3| Lincoln, Nebraska
|-
|Loss
|25-7
|align=left| Kyle Dake
|style="font-size:88%"|1-2
|-
|Win
|25-6
|align=left| Chance Marsteller
|style="font-size:88%"|TF 10-0
|-
! style=background:white colspan=7 | 
|-
|Win
|24-7
|align=left| Anthony Valencia
|style="font-size:88%"|Fall
|style="font-size:88%" rowspan=6|April 26–29, 2017
|style="font-size:88%" rowspan=6|2017 US Open National Championships
|style="text-align:left;font-size:88%;" rowspan=6|
 Las Vegas, Nevada
|-
|Win
|23-7
|align=left| Chris Perry
|style="font-size:88%"|3-2
|-
|Loss
|22-7
|align=left| Kyle Dake
|style="font-size:88%"|0-3
|-
|Win
|22-6
|align=left| Anthony Valencia
|style="font-size:88%"|11-9
|-
|Win
|21-6
|align=left| Ed Havlovic
|style="font-size:88%"|TF 12-0
|-
|Win
|20-6
|align=left| Chance Marsteller
|style="font-size:88%"|5-3
|-
! style=background:white colspan=7 |
|-
|Win
|19-6
|align=left| Aleksey Shcherbak
|style="font-size:88%"|Fall
|style="font-size:88%" rowspan=4|March 3–4, 2017
|style="font-size:88%" rowspan=4|XXI Outstanding Ukrainian Wrestlers and Coaches Memorial
|style="text-align:left;font-size:88%;" rowspan=4| Kyiv, Ukraine
|-
|Loss
|18-6
|align=left| Reza Afzali
|style="font-size:88%"|5-7
|-
|Win
|18-5
|align=left| Svetoslav Dimitrov
|style="font-size:88%"|TF 11-1
|-
|Win
|17-5
|align=left| Rustam Rasuev
|style="font-size:88%"|Fall
|-
! style=background:white colspan=7 | 
|-
|Loss
|16-5
|align=left| Kyle Dake
|style="font-size:88%"|TF 0-10
|style="font-size:88%" rowspan=3|January 28–29, 2017
|style="font-size:88%" rowspan=3|2017 Grand Prix of Paris
|style="text-align:left;font-size:88%;" rowspan=3|
 Paris, France
|-
|Win
|16-4
|align=left| Kubilay Çakıcı
|style="font-size:88%"|TF 11-1
|-
|Win
|15-4
|align=left| Henri Selenius
|style="font-size:88%"|9-0
|-
! style=background:white colspan=7 |
|-
|Win
|14-4
|align=left| Reza Afzali
|style="font-size:88%"|6-4
|style="font-size:88%" rowspan=4|November 30 - December 1, 2016
|style="font-size:88%" rowspan=4|2016 World Wrestling Clubs Cup - Men's freestyle
|style="text-align:left;font-size:88%;" rowspan=4| Kharkiv, Ukraine
|-
|Win
|13-4
|align=left| Giya Chikladze
|style="font-size:88%"|TF 10-0
|-
|Win
|12-4
|align=left| Avtandil Kentchadze
|style="font-size:88%"|TF 13-0
|-
|Win
|11-4
|align=left| Ruslan Rychko
|style="font-size:88%"|TF 10-0
|-
! style=background:white colspan=7 | 
|-
|Win
|10-4
|align=left| Bekzod Abdurakhmonov
|style="font-size:88%"|8-2
|style="font-size:88%" rowspan=3|November 10–12, 2016
|style="font-size:88%" rowspan=3|2016 Bill Farrell Memorial International
|style="text-align:left;font-size:88%;" rowspan=3|
 Iowa City, Iowa
|-
|Win
|9-4
|align=left| Chance Marsteller
|style="font-size:88%"|TF 10-0
|-
|Win
|8-4
|align=left| Quinton Godley
|style="font-size:88%"|TF 10-0
|-
! style=background:white colspan=7 | 
|-
|Loss
|7-4
|align=left| Gadzhi Gadzhiev
|style="font-size:88%"|4-4
|style="font-size:88%" rowspan=2|October 14–16, 2016
|style="font-size:88%" rowspan=2|2016 International Cup
|style="text-align:left;font-size:88%;" rowspan=2|
 Khasavyurt, Russia
|-
|Win
|7-3
|align=left| Rasul Shapiev
|style="font-size:88%"|Fall
|-
! style=background:white colspan=7 |
|-
|Win
|6-3
|align=left| Jakob Makarashvili
|style="font-size:88%"|10-1
|style="font-size:88%" rowspan=4|June 11–12, 2016
|style="font-size:88%" rowspan=4|2016 Wrestling World Cup – Men's freestyle
|style="text-align:left;font-size:88%;" rowspan=4| Los Angeles, California
|-
|Win
|5-3
|align=left| Ashraf Aliyev
|style="font-size:88%"|8-0
|-
|Loss
|4-3
|align=left| Hassan Yazdani
|style="font-size:88%"|TF 0-10
|-
|Loss
|4-2
|align=left| Parveen Rana
|style="font-size:88%"|4-5
|-
! style=background:white colspan=7 | 
|-
|Win
|4-1
|align=left| Nick Marable
|style="font-size:88%"|2-1
|style="font-size:88%" rowspan=5|April 22, 2016
|style="font-size:88%" rowspan=5|2016 US Olympic Team Trials Challenge
|style="text-align:left;font-size:88%;" rowspan=5|
 Iowa City, Iowa
|-
|Win
|3-1
|align=left| Adam Hall
|style="font-size:88%"|6-3
|-
|Win
|2-1
|align=left| Logan Massa
|style="font-size:88%"|TF 10-0
|-
|Loss
|1-1
|align=left| Andrew Howe
|style="font-size:88%"|2-5
|-
|Win
|1-0
|align=left| Adam Hall
|style="font-size:88%"|10-4
|-

References

External links
 
 
 

1993 births
Living people
American male sport wrestlers
Oklahoma State Cowboys wrestlers
People from Port Washington, Wisconsin
Pan American Wrestling Championships medalists
20th-century American people
21st-century American people